The Nevada congressional elections of 2006 took place on November 7, 2006 when each of the state's three congressional districts elected a representative to the United States House of Representatives. Although President George W. Bush captured the state in both the 2000 and 2004 elections, he did so with a very slim margin (3.35% in 2000 and just 2.59% in 2004). Nevada was considered a battleground state due to the close victory margins.

Overview

District 1

Candidates

Democratic Party 
Incumbent Shelley Berkley has served four terms. In Congress, she serves in the Committees on Transportation and Infrastructure, Veterans' Affairs, and International Relations.

Republican Party 
Kenneth Wegner

Libertarian Party 
Jim Duensing

Results

District 2 

Republican Party candidate Dean Heller won the election. It was an open seat, because the incumbent, Republican Jim Gibbons, made a successful run for governor of the state.

A bitterly contested Republican primary on August 15, 2006 was won by Secretary of State Dean Heller.  The Democratic nominee, Jill Derby, Regent for the University and Community College System of Nevada, had no primary opposition.

In late August, CQPolitics.com analyzed the race: "Although the 2nd District generally leans Republican, Derby's competitive position in the general election was already strengthened by the fact that she was unopposed in the Aug. 15 Democratic primary while the Republicans staged a bruising battle among three well-known candidates."

Primary election

Democratic 
Jill Derby had no opposition for the Democratic nomination.

Republican

Campaign 
On the Republican side, there was a "fiercely contested and often bruising" three-way race (with two minor candidates raising the total to five candidates).  The two major candidates other than Heller were state assemblywoman Sharron Angle was former state Representative Dawn Gibbons, wife of the outgoing incumbent.  The Club for Growth poured in over $1 million backing Angle, and ran ads attacking both Heller and Gibbons as being "liberal" and in favor of tax increases.

Results 
The official results were:

Republican Primary

Refusal to concede 
After the primary, Angle refused to concede, complaining of voting irregularities that disenfranchised many voters in her popular home base of Washoe County, which includes Reno and is by far the district’s most populous and vote-rich jurisdiction.  Rather than calling for a recount — the typical route for candidates who challenge close election outcomes — Angle demanded to have the entire primary invalidated and held again. CQPolitics.com noted "Some have charged Angle’s decision to call for a special primary was based on economics: Had she demanded a recount, Angle would have been responsible for the cost of the procedure unless the result vindicated her request for it. That would not be the case if the courts were to order a primary do-over."

Exacerbating the disunity of the Nevada GOP, Nevada's Republican Party chairman, Paul Adams, announced his support for Angle's court challenge.

At a September 1 state court hearing, District Judge Bill Maddox rejected Angle’s request on grounds that the state court lacks jurisdiction in congressional elections. According to Maddox, only the U.S. House of Representatives has standing to call for a new election.  At that point, Angle conceded the race.

General election

Campaign 
The bruising GOP primary, as compared to the Democratic situation, was reflected in the cash reserves reported by each candidate in their pre-primary filings with the Federal Election Commission. Derby had $444,000 on hand as of July 26, out of $748,000 raised. Heller had 260,000 left — and that was with 20 days left to go before the actual primary — out of $904,000 in total receipts, which included $108,000 in funds from his personal accounts.

Polls and ratings 
The Las Vegas Sun, quoting University of Nevada-Reno political scientist Eric Herzik, noted that the intra-fighting has given the Democratic Party a change in this otherwise Republican leaning district.  "Jill Derby was already doing everything right, and then she gets this gift," he said. "How do you turn a safe district into a competitive one? Fight among yourselves. Republicans here have won because they've stayed united and they continue to turn out. Now you've got partisan infighting, and Adams' leadership is aiding and abetting that - in an already bad year for Republicans."

In early September, CQPolitics.com rated this race as Leans Republican   In early October, CQPolitics.com rated it as Republican Favored

A Mason-Dixon poll has shown Heller with a slight edge, but within the margin or error, leading 45% to 42%.

Polling

Other candidates 
There are three non-major party candidates in the race:
 James Krochus, Independent American Party
 Scott Babb, Libertarian
 Daniel Rosen, Independent

External links 
Jill Derby's Congressional campaign site
Dean Heller's Congressional campaign site
Daniel Rosen's Congressional campaign site

Results

District 3

Candidates

Democratic Party 
Tessa Hafen is a former press secretary for US Senate Minority Leader Harry Reid.

Republican Party 
Incumbent Jon C. Porter is a member of the Transportation and Infrastructure Committee and the Committee on Education and the Workforce. He is the chairman of the Federal Workforce and Agency Organization Subcommittee, which belongs to the full House Government Reform Committee. He is a member of the moderate/liberal Republican Main Street Partnership and is a supporter of stem-cell research.

Libertarian Party 
Joseph Silvestri

Overview

Election Results

References

2006
Nevada

2006 Nevada elections